Nothin But Love is the 16th studio album by the blues guitarist Robert Cray. It was released on August 28, 2012, through Provogue Records. It was his first studio album since 2009's This Time. The album was released on CD and vinyl.

Track listing
"Won't Be Coming Home" (Richard Cousins, Hendrix Ackle)  
"Worry" (Jim Pugh, Tony Braunagel) 
"I'll Always Remember You" (Pugh)  
"Side Dish" (Robert Cray)  
"A Memo" (Cousins, Ackle) 
"Blues Get Off My Shoulder" (Bobby Parker Jr.) 
"Fix This" (Cray)
"I'm Done Cryin'" (Cray) 
"Great Big Old House" (Cray)
"Sadder Days" (Cray)

Limited Edition Deluxe Version
11. "You Belong To Me (Bonus Track)" (Pee Wee King)

The Limited Edition Deluxe Version also includes an extended booklet (40 pages) with The Making of the album by Henry Yates, as well as other album information.

Personnel
Robert Cray Band
Robert Cray - vocals, guitar
Jim Pugh - piano, Hammond organ
Richard Cousins - bass
Tony Braunagel - drums

Additional personnel

Jeff Bova - string arrangements
Ron Dziubla - saxophone
Vincenzo Giammanco - photography
Chad Jensen - management
Jeff Katz - photography

Roy Koch - artwork
Jared Kvitka - engineer
Kevin Shirley - mixing, producer
Lee Thornburg - horn arrangements, trombone, trumpet
Leon Zervos - mastering

Charts

References

2010 albums
Robert Cray albums